Harold Henry "Hank" Burnine (November 9, 1932 – January 21, 2020) was an American football end who played two seasons in the National Football League with the New York Giants and Philadelphia Eagles. He was drafted by the New York Giants in the twelfth round of the 1955 NFL Draft. He played college football at the University of Missouri and attended Richmond High School in Richmond, Missouri.

College career
Burnine played for the Missouri Tigers from 1953 to 1955. He led the NCAA in receptions with 44 and in receiving yards with 594 his senior year in 1955 while also earning All-American honors. He recorded career totals of 75 receptions for 1,145 yards. Burnine was team captain his senior season and also played in the Blue–Gray Football Classic and Senior Bowl. He won two track letters for the Tigers as a broad jumper. He was inducted into the University of Missouri Intercollegiate Athletics Hall of Fame in 1993.

Professional career

New York Giants
Burnine was selected by the New York Giants with the 140th pick in the 1955 NFL Draft. He played in one game for the Giants during the 1956 season.

Philadelphia Eagles
Burnine played in fourteen games, starting seven, for the Philadelphia Eagles from 1956 to 1957.

Personal life
Burnine was also a sergeant in the United States Army. He started selling life insurance during the college football offseason.

He died on January 21, 2020, in Higginsville, Missouri at age 87.

See also
 List of NCAA major college football yearly receiving leaders

References

External links
Just Sports Stats

1932 births
2020 deaths
Players of American football from Missouri
American football ends
Missouri Tigers football players
New York Giants players
Philadelphia Eagles players
American male long jumpers
College men's track and field athletes in the United States
United States Army soldiers
20th-century American businesspeople
American businesspeople in insurance
Insurance agents
Businesspeople from Missouri
People from Ray County, Missouri